Roger Chaunce may refer to:

Roger Chaunce (fl. 1377-1399), MP for Reigate
Roger Chaunce (fl. 1414-1429), MP for Reigate